Messer Chups is a surf rock band from Saint Petersburg, Russia. The group was formed in 1998 by composer and guitarist Oleg Fomchenkov.

History 
Messer Chups is often considered a "spin-off" band of Messer für Frau Müller. In the group's name, "Messer" is taken from the German word for "knife" and "Chups" from Chupa Chups lollipops.

The band was originally a duo of Gitarkin on bass guitar and Annette Schneider on synthesizer.

In 2003, Oleg Tarasov, the producer of Messer Chups and head of their home label Solnze Records, invited the world famous theremin player Lydia Kavina to join them. Together they have released several albums and reworked their previous releases. In 2005, Messer Chups became a duo consisting of Gitarkin and Svetlana "Zombierella" Nagaeva on bass. In 2007, they became a trio, with drummer  from the band Leningrad. In 2008, they changed their drummer to Alexander Belkok, and Alexander Skvortzov became their vocalist.

The group's music was used for the soundtrack for the dating sim Monster Prom.

Musical style 
Messer Chups combines surf rock and traditional Russian music, as well as using samples from historical recordings, lounge music, and vintage film soundtracks. Their live shows feature projections of old horror and sci-fi movies. Gitarkin has cited Link Wray and The Ventures as influences.

Members
As of 2019, the group's line-up consisted of:
Oleg "Guitaracula" Fomchenkov (aka Oleg Gitarkin) – guitar
Svetlana "Zombierella" Nagaeva –  bass
Evgeny Lomakin (aka "Rocking Eugene") – drums

Albums
Messer Chups:
Chudovishe & Chudovishe (Beast and the Beast) (aka Monster & Monster) (1999) MC, CD
Miss Libido (2000) MC, CD
Bride Of The Atom (2000) MC, CD
Vamp Babes (2000) MC, CD
Black Black Magic (2002) CD
The Best Of Messer Chups: Cocktail Draculina (2002) CD
Crazy Price (2003) CD
Vamp Babes Upgrade Version 2004 (2004) CD
Crazy Price (new version) (2005) CD
Hyena Safari (2005) CD
Hyena Safari (2nd version)(2006) CD
Zombie Shopping (2007) CD
Best of The Best (2008) LP/CD
Heretic Channel (2009) CD/LP
Bermuda 66 (2010) CD
Surf Riders from The Swamp Lagoon (2011) CD
Church of Reverb (2012) CD/LP
The Incredible Crocotiger (2015) CD/LP
Spooky Hook (2015) CD/LP
Taste the Blood of Guitaracula (2017) CD
Mondo Harp (2019) CD
Don't Say Cheese (2020)
Visiting the Skeleton in the Closet (2022)
Adventures of Zombierella and Guitaracula (2023)

Messer für Frau Müller:
Merry Bormans (1991) unreleased
Happy End Dead (1992) MC, CD released in 2000
Little Joys (1992) MC, CD released in 2000
Senjors Crakovjac (1993) MC, LP 1994, CD 2000
Icicle-Murders (1995) MC
Nechelovek-Vidimka (1996) MC
„Hello, Superman!“ (1998) MC, CD
Second Hand Dreams (2000) MC, CD
Allo, Superman! (2000) CD incl. 3 bonus tracks
Hyper Utesov Presents (2001) CD
Second Hand Dreams (2001) CD incl. 3 bonus tracks
Treugol'nik, Chert I Tochka (2003) CD
Remixodelica (2005) CD
Triangle, Dot & Devil (2006) CD
Danger Retrobolik (2006) CD
Wake Up The Dead (2008) CD / (2009) LP

Messer Chups & Messer für Frau Müller video DVD 2006

Messer Chups video DVD 2008

References

External links
 Messer Chups official website (archived)

 Photos from Les Transmusicales festival 2005

Musical groups from Saint Petersburg
Russian electronic music groups
Surf music groups